Indian Creek is a stream in Monroe and 
Ralls counties in the U.S. state of Missouri. It is a tributary to the Salt River within Mark Twain Lake.

The origin of the name Indian Creek is unclear. The creek may have been so named on account of the red tinted water.

See also
List of rivers of Missouri

References

Rivers of Monroe County, Missouri
Rivers of Ralls County, Missouri
Rivers of Missouri